Lars Kristofer Åström is a Swedish singer-songwriter. He is also the lead singer of the band Fireside.

Discography

Albums 
 1998 - Go, Went, Gone
 2001 - Leaving Songs
 2001 - Northern Blues
 2004 - Loupita
 2005 - So Much for Staying Alive
 2007 - RainawayTown
 2009 - Sinkadus
 2011 - From Eagle to Sparrow
 2013 - An Introduction To (collection of previously released songs)
 2015 - The Story Of A Heart's Decay
 2015 - Göteborg String Session (Live Album)
 2018 - Quadrilogy (Collection of the 4 EP:s, Dead End, There For, Black Valley & Hold On Lioness)
 2020 - Hard Times

EPs 

 2003 - Dead End EP
 2003 - Plastered Confessions
 2004 - There For EP
 2006 - Black Valley EP
 2009 - When Her Eyes Turn Blue EP
 2016 - Pipe Dream EP
 2018 - Hold On Lioness EP

Other 

 2005 - The Thorskogs Sessions (Released as an extra CD with limited edition version of "So Much For Staying Alive")

Singles 

 1999 - "Poor Young Man's Heart"
 2001 - "What I Came Here For/Leaving Song"
 2002 - "Connected"
 2002 - "All Lovers Hell"
 2004 - "The Wild"
 2005 - "The Good You Bring/Walpurgis Night"
 2007 - "Just A Little Insane"
 2009 - "Twentyseven"
 2009 - Kristofer Åström/All Fox (Split with All Fox. Åström contributed with the song "Twentyseven")

Compilations 
 2002 - Not One Light Red: A Desert Extended (The song "All Lover's Hell (Confined)")
 2003 - Startracks (The songs "One Good Moment" & "8 Long Years")
 2004 - Money Talks (The song "Twinreceiver")
 2004 - Picknick (The songs "Idiot Talk" & "Cardiac")
 2006 - If We Were Oceans (The songs "She Came With a Friend of Mine" & "Just Like Me")
 2006 - Påtalåtar (The song "Vällingklockan")
 2006 - Oh No... It's Christmas (The song "I Saw Mommy Kissing Santa Claus")
 2007 - Souvenir desde Umeå (The song "Conjure Me")
 2007 - Poem, ballader och lite blues – Återbesöket (The song "Blues för Inga-Maj")

External links 
 Kristofer Åström official site
 Video Interview: What is really important to you?
 Startracks

References 

Living people
Year of birth missing (living people)
Swedish male singer-songwriters
Swedish singer-songwriters